In the Netherlands, tegelspreuken are tiles inscribed with proverbs or aphorisms, often in blue-and-white Delftware style, used as decorative wall-hangings. 

The first known Dutch tile with an aphorism was a floor tile from the mid-16th century. However, the tradition of hanging blue and white tiles with sayings on the wall did not arise until the 20th century. Designer Arie Kortenhoff created many popular 20th-century tegelspreuken. Though the tradition was fading at one point, tegelspreuken have recently enjoyed a kitsch revival. Today, tegelspreuken are frequently sold in gift shops and souvenir shops. A 2009 exhibition at the Dutch Tile Museum in Otterlo explored the tradition of these tiles. In August 2017, 100% NL sponsored the first National Tegelspreuken Day in Volendam. 

The sayings inscribed on tegelspreuken are called tegeltjeswijsheid (Dutch: tile wisdom). The term tegeltjeswijsheid is also used more generally to describe clichéd proverbs or aphorisms not inscribed on tiles. In 2016, Plus Magazine ran a contest to identify the best tegeltjeswijsheid.

References

Proverbs
Dutch pottery
Tiling